The Lightning Warrior is a 1931 American Pre-Code Mascot movie serial starring Rin Tin Tin in his last role. It is regarded as one of the better Mascot serials. A number of the production's outdoor action sequences were filmed on the rocky Iverson Movie Ranch in Chatsworth, California, known for its huge sandstone boulders and widely recognized as the most heavily filmed outdoor shooting location in the history of the movies. This was the original Rin Tin Tin's last movie, as he died in 1932, being replaced that same year by Rin Tin Tin Jr.

Plot
The Wolfman, a mysterious masked figure, is leading an Indian uprising to drive local settlers off their land.  The Wolfman kills Jimmy Carter's father and Alan Scott's brother, which leads the two heroes and Alan's dog Rinty to hunt down and defeat the villain.

Cast
Rin Tin Tin as "Rinty", a dog known as The Lightning Warrior to the local Indians
Frankie Darro as Jimmy Carter
George Brent as Alan Scott, government agent 
Patrick H. O'Malley, Jr. as Sheriff Brown
Georgia Hale as Dianne
Theodore Lorch as Pierre La Farge
Lafe McKee as John Hayden
Frank Brownlee as Angus McDonald
Bob Kortman as Wells, henchman
Dick Dickinson as Adams, henchman
Yakima Canutt as Ken Davis and Deputy
Frank Lanning as Indian George/ Jim

Chapter titles
 Drums of Doom
 The Wolf Man
 Empty Saddles
 Flaming Arrows
 The Invisible Enemy
 The Fatal Name
 The Ordeal of Fire
 The Man Who Knew
 Traitor's Hour
 Secret of the Cave
 Red Shadows
 Painted Faces
Source:

References

External links

Filming of "The Lightning Warrrior" in the Iverson Gorge on the Iverson Movie Ranch
 Iverson Movie Ranch: History, vintage photos.

1931 films
1930s English-language films
1931 Western (genre) films
Films about dogs
American black-and-white films
Mascot Pictures film serials
Films directed by Armand Schaefer
American Western (genre) films
Films produced by Nat Levine
Rin Tin Tin
1930s American films